Avadis "Avie" Tevanian (born 1961) is an American-Armenian software engineer. At Carnegie Mellon University, he was a principal designer and engineer of the Mach operating system (also known as the Mach Kernel). He leveraged that work at NeXT Inc. as the foundation of the NeXTSTEP operating system. He was senior vice president of software engineering at Apple from 1997 to 2003, and then chief software technology officer from 2003 to 2006. There, he redesigned NeXTSTEP to become macOS. Apple’s macOS and iOS both incorporate the Mach Kernel, and iPadOS, watchOS, and tvOS are all derived from iOS. He was a longtime friend of Steve Jobs.

Early life
Tevanian is from Westbrook, Maine. He is of Armenian descent. Tevanian cloned the 1980s arcade game Missile Command, giving it the same name in a version for the Xerox Alto, and Mac Missiles! for the Macintosh platform. He has a B.A. in mathematics from the University of Rochester and M.S. and Ph.D. degrees in computer science from Carnegie Mellon University. There, he was a principal designer and engineer of the Mach operating system.

Career

NeXT Inc.
He was Vice President of Software Engineering at NeXT Inc. and was responsible for managing NeXT's software engineering department. There, he designed the NeXTSTEP operating system, based upon his previous academic work on Mach.

Apple Inc.
He was senior vice president of software engineering at Apple from 1997 to 2003, and then chief software technology officer from 2003 to 2006. There, he redesigned NeXTSTEP to become macOS, which became iOS.

In United States v. Microsoft in 2001, he was a witness for the United States Department of Justice, testifying against Microsoft.

Theranos and Dolby Labs
Tevanian left Apple on March 31, 2006, and joined the boards of both Dolby Labs and Theranos, Inc. He resigned from the board of Theranos in late 2007, with an acrimonious ending as he faced legal threats and was forced to waive his right to buy a company cofounder's shares, actions he believed were in retaliation for the skepticism he was often alone in expressing about the company's finances and progress in developing its technology at board meetings. In May 2006, he joined the board of Tellme Networks, which was later sold to Microsoft. On January 12, 2010, he became managing director of Elevation Partners. In July 2015, he cofounded NextEquity Partners and as of 2017 is serving as Managing Director.

References

External links
 Avie Tevanian, oral history, Computer History Museum

1961 births
American computer scientists
American people of Armenian descent
Apple Inc. employees
Apple Inc. executives
Armenian scientists
Carnegie Mellon University alumni
Date of birth missing (living people)
Living people
Macintosh operating systems people
NeXT
People from Westbrook, Maine
Place of birth missing (living people)
Theranos people
University of Rochester alumni